Street Warrior is a 2008 action film directed by David Jackson and starring Reiley McClendon, Simon R. Baker, and Sidney S. Liufau.

Premise
Sgt. Jack Campbell (Max Martini), an Iraq War veteran, returns home to find that his brother is in a coma from participating in an illegal underground fight club. Enraged by this, he goes to find the people responsible and takes down anyone who gets in his way.

External links
 

2008 television films
2008 films
American action films
2008 action films
Films directed by David Jackson (director)
2000s English-language films
2000s American films